Makeni Teacher's College formerly St Augustine’s Teachers College is a two to three years public college located in Makeni, Bombali District, Sierra Leone. It was founded in 1964. The college trains prospective teachers for primary and junior secondary school levels (form 1-3). After successfully completing the programme, candidates qualify for the Teachers Certificate (TC) and the Higher Teachers Certificate (HTC).  The college offers programmes in English studies, social studies, environmental science, agriculture and Mathematics education.

Current programmes
 School of Community Health Services
 School of Social Sciences
 School of Agriculture
 School of Environmental Sciences
 School of Technology
 school of business management
 school of social studies

External links
http://www.sierra-leone.org/emailt-v.html

Universities and colleges in Sierra Leone
1964 establishments in Sierra Leone
Educational institutions established in 1964
Makeni